The list of Western Australia state by-elections includes every by-election held in the Australian state of Western Australia. By-elections occur whenever there is a vacancy in the Legislative Assembly (or, historically, the Legislative Council), although an imminent state election may allow the vacancy to remain until the dissolution of parliament.

Section 67 of the Electoral Act 1907 requires the Speaker to issue a writ for a by-election to fill the vacancy. This can either take place after a resolution of the House if Parliament is in session, or simply upon the cause being established by the Speaker acting alone if the Parliament is in adjournment for more than 7 days.

Causes
A by-election occurs whenever there is a vacancy in the Legislative Assembly. Vacancies can occur for the following reasons, according to Section 38 of the Constitution Acts Amendment Act 1899.

The member:

 Is no longer eligible to sit—for example, leaving the State. This historically occurred more frequently when times were less economically stable, and people would move to another state or country where they could work or conduct business.
 Has been convicted for an offence for which the penalty was imprisonment for life, or for more than five years (Section 32). This last happened to John Marquis Hopkins when he was convicted for fraud in 1910, necessitating a by-election in his seat of Beverley.
 Becomes an undischarged bankrupt. This last happened in 1936 when Independent candidate Thomas Hughes won East Perth against the incumbent member in the 1936 election. However it was found that he was an undischarged bankrupt at the time of the nomination and poll (although had since resolved his affairs), and the election was declared void. He won the resulting by-election.
 Is elected to either the Federal Parliament or the parliament of another state or territory (Section 34). In practice, this is never necessary, as the other Parliament usually requires resignation from the Western Australian parliament in order to nominate as a candidate. This last occurred in the Legislative Assembly in 2001 when Hendy Cowan, the member for Merredin, resigned to unsuccessfully contest a seat in the Australian Senate.
 Is appointed as a judge or magistrate in a Western Australian court or as a chairman (or in some cases member) of another state board or tribunal (Section 34). This provision has never been acted upon, although numerous members have resigned over time to take up such an appointment—for example, Ron Davies resigned in Victoria Park in 1986 to become Agent-General for Western Australia in London, whilst Deputy Premier Herb Graham resigned in Balcatta in 1973 to become chairman of the Licensing Board.
 "Holds an office or place in the service of the Crown" at the time at which they take up their seat (Section 36-37). This has never been used at state level, although it has occurred in other States and in the Federal Parliament (for example, the circumstances leading to the federal Lindsay by-election in 1996.)
 Becomes "of unsound mind".
 Pledges allegiance to a foreign power after their election. This does not apply to members who are already dual citizens at the time of their election, unlike the equivalent section in the Federal Constitution.
 Fails to attend the House for one entire session without the permission of the House. The last time this caused a by-election was in 1915 when Joseph Gardiner, the Labor member for Roebourne, disappeared, necessitating a by-election in which an Opposition candidate was victorious, wiping out the Government's one-seat majority.

Additional reasons not within Section 38 include:

 Death. This last occurred in January 2008, when Trevor Sprigg, the member for Murdoch, died suddenly and a by-election had to be called.
 Resignation, "by writing under his hand, addressed to the Speaker" (Section 25). This last occurred in September 2014, when Troy Buswell, the member for Vasse, resigned from the Parliament, necessitating a by-election.
 A Court of Disputed Returns voids the results. The last time a by-election took place for this reason was in 1983, when Gavan Troy, the Labor candidate, narrowly defeated incumbent Liberal member Tom Herzfeld in Mundaring. The seat was won by Troy by a larger margin at the resulting by-election.

Ministerial by-elections
Until a constitutional amendment in 1947, it was necessary for members who were appointed as a Minister to resign their seat and contest their seat at a ministerial by-election. This was because the Ministers became members of the Executive Council, which reported to the Governor of Western Australia and was therefore deemed an "office of profit" under the Crown. Most ministerial by-elections were a formality with the Minister being re-elected unopposed, but on two occasions, in 1901 and 1917, Ministers were defeated at the by-elections, in the former case directly causing the fall of the Morgans Ministry.

List of Legislative Assembly by-elections

2020–2029

2010–2019

2000–2009

1990–1999

  The Independent member for Ashburton, Pam Buchanan, was elected at the 1989 state election as a member of the Labor Party, but resigned on 1 February 1991 to sit as an Independent. As such, the 1992 by-election is noted as a retain for Labor.

1980–1989

1970–1979

1960–1969

1950–1959

† Won by acclamation; this date is the date of the return of the writ.

1940–1949

 At the 1943 election, the Labor candidate for Greenough, John Newton, a farmer from Mingenew who had enlisted in the RAAF as a Flight Lieutenant in 1941 and left for the United Kingdom in 1942, unexpectedly defeated the sitting Country member, William Patrick. On 14 January 1944, he was reported missing after a raid on Germany. On 31 July 1945, a panel of members was appointed to enquire whether a vacancy existed, and on 27 September 1945, the seat was declared vacant. At the resulting by-election on 27 October 1945, Liberal candidate David Brand was successful, becoming the first person to win an Australian election under the new Liberal banner.

1930–1939

† Won by acclamation; this date is the date of the return of the writ.

1920–1929

  Simons had been elected as a Labor member in the 1921 state election, but had resigned to sit as an independent and subsequently joined the Nationalist Party. He was a candidate in the by-election, but was defeated.
† Won by acclamation; this date is the date of the return of the writ.

1910–1919

† Won by acclamation; this date is the date of the return of the writ.
 The Labor member for Brown Hill-Ivanhoe and former Premier, John Scaddan, resigned from his seat on 8 August 1916 in order to contest the Canning ministerial by-election against new minister Robert Robinson. On 19 August 1916, Labor candidate John Lutey was elected unopposed to fill the vacancy. However, upon Scaddan's narrow loss in Canning, Lutey resigned from the seat on 15 September 1916 before being sworn in to allow Scaddan to regain his seat, which he did at the resulting by-election on 7 October 1916 against two minor-party candidates. In March 1917, Scaddan and several others left the Labor Party and joined the new National Labor Party. This party formed a coalition with the Nationalists who, under Premier Sir Henry Lefroy, formed a Ministry on 28 June 1917. Scaddan was appointed Minister for Railways, and had to contest a ministerial by-election. John Lutey won the seat at the by-election on 21 July 1917.
 On 18 December 1915, the Labor member for Williams-Narrogin, Bertie Johnston, resigned from the Labor Party and from Parliament. He was returned unopposed as an Independent at the close of nominations for the resulting by-election on 9 January 1916. In mid-1917, he joined the Country Party.

1900–1909

† Won by acclamation; this date is the date of the return of the writ.

1890–1899

† Won by acclamation; this date is the date of the return of the writ.
†† This was the date which the writ was issued — the date of the event which caused the by-election is unknown.

Ministerial by-elections
The following Ministers had to resign their seats and recontest them at a ministerial by-election. Most were unopposed; these are noted in italics in the table.

List of Legislative Council vacancies

Notes

References
 By-elections in Western Australia (Parliamentary Library)
 

Western Australia

Elections, state by-elections